Tertius Reynders is a South African former professional tennis player.

Reynders, who played a year of collegiate tennis at the University of Tulsa before turning professional, reached a best singles world ranking of 341 during his career. He twice featured in the qualifying draw at Wimbledon and made his only Grand Prix/ATP Tour singles main draw appearance at the 1989 Volvo International in Stratton Mountain.

References

External links
 
 

Year of birth missing (living people)
Living people
South African male tennis players
Tulsa Golden Hurricane men's tennis players